The Dhanauri Wetlands is a birdwatching area located in Thasrana, Uttar Pradesh, India.

Biodiversity 
The Dhanauri Wetlands is home to over 120 Sarus cranes.

References

External links 
 Dhanauri may be listed as wetland to protect sarus
 Bird watchers discover new wetland in Greater Noida